Joseph Schechtman (1891–1970) was a Russian-born Revisionist Zionist activist and author. He was the author of numerous books of history, biography and works on Zionism.

Biography
Joseph Boris (Ber) Schechtman was born in Odessa in the Russian Empire (today in Ukraine). While participating in the Zionist youth movement, he met Ze'ev Jabotinsky.

Schechtman studied at Novorossia Imperial University in Odessa. There he established contacts with members of the Ukrainian national movement. In 1910 he published an article in the journal "Еврейский мир" (Jewish World) in St. Petersburg, calling for Ukrainian-Jewish dialogue. In 1917, back in Odessa, he published pamphlets «Евреи и украинцы» (Jews and Ukrainians) and «Национальные движения в свободной России» (National Movements in the Free Russia).

Zionist activism
In May 1917, Schechtman was a delegate to the Seventh All-Russian Conference of Zionists that took place in Petrograd and to the All-Russian Jewish Congress that took place in Moscow during June–July 1918. In 1918 he was elected to the Jewish National Council of Ukraine. In 1918-1919 he worked in its executive agency, Jewish National Secretariat.

In 1920 Schechtman left Bolshevik Russia. He entered Berlin University, and actively participated in the Federation of Russian-Ukrainian Zionists.  From September 1922 he co-edited weekly Russian-language "Рассвет" (The Dawn) with Jabotinsky.

Schechtman was one of the founders of the World Union of Revisionist Zionism (Paris, 1925). In 1929-1931 he was the editor of Yiddish weekly "Der Noyer Veg" (The New Way) in Paris. From 1931 to 1935 Schechtman was a member of the executive committee of the Zionist Organization (WZO), when both he and Jabotinsky left the ZO to co-found the New Zionist Organization.

Emigration to the U.S.
Schechtman emigrated to the United States in the summer of 1941, and soon became part of the 'inner circle' of the New Zionist Organization of America (NZOA). In 1941-1943 he worked at YIVO. In 1943-1944 he was the director of Bureau for Study of Population Migration which he co-founded earlier. In 1944-1945 he worked as a consultant on questions of the migration of the Office of Strategic Services (OSS).

Schechtman was the chairman of the Association of American Zionists-Revisionists. In 1946, New Zionist Organization self-liquidated to rejoin the WZO. Schechtman served as a member of the executive committee of the WZO until 1970. In 1963-1965 and 1966-1968 he was a member of the executive committee of the Jewish Agency for Israel.

Literary career
Schechtman became a close associate<ref>Benjamin, R., & Cebon, D. (2012). The Forgotten Zionist: The life of Solomon (Sioma) Yankelevitch Jacobi. Jerusalem: Gefen Publishing House pg  vii</ref> and secretary Rapoport, L. (1999). Shake heaven & earth: Peter Bergson and the struggle to rescue the Jews of Europe.Jerusalem: Gefen Publishing House. pg. 28 to Ze'ev Jabotinsky, and would later write the two-volume biography of his life. 
Schectman wrote numerous books and articles dedicated to Jewish and world history, human migrations, population transfer and refugee issues.

In later years he also wrote a biography of the late Mufti of Jerusalem, Haj Amin el-Husseini.

In his 1961 book Star in Eclipse: Russian Jewry Revisited, he provided an account of the Babi Yar tragedy.

Schechtman early established his reputation as a pioneer and authority on changing population movements in the world and population transfers.Roucekp, Joseph. The Journal of Modern History, Vol. 20, No. 1 (Mar., 1948). Review: European Population Transfers, 1939-1945 pg 65

Schechtman was the "first to establish basic guidelines for successful transfers and to argue persuasively that transfers should be treated as preventative measures not punitive."

Palestinian "evacuation order"
His work on the Palestinian refugee problem was heavily criticised by Erskine ChildersErskine Childers, The Other Exodus, in Laqueur, op.cit. pp.182-3 and Steven Glazer for misquoting, carefully selecting words, and taking statements out of context to fit his narrative.

Walid Khalidi attributes to Schechtman the position, which Khalidi regards as groundless, that the Palestinian people fled their towns and villages in 1948 in response to Arab broadcasts advising them to do so. Schechtman was the anonymous author of two smaller works published in 1949 for which he takes credit in the introduction to his 1952 book, The Arab Refugee Problem  and where, according to Khalidi, the reference to the evacuation order first appeared.

Published works

(1944). Jews in German-occupied Soviet territory. New York: Union of Russian Jews.
(1946). European population transfers, 1939-1945. New York, Oxford University Press, 1891–1970.  OCLC=229926
(1946) The Elimination of German Minorities in Southeastern Europe. N.p, 1946. 
(1949) Population Transfers in Asia. New York: Hallsby Press, OCLC Number: 502265
(1952)  The Arab refugee problem. New York, Philosophical Library.
(1953) Minorities in the Arab world. Washington.    
(1956)  The Vladimir Jabotinsky story. New York, T. Yoseloff.  OCLC Number: 2661192  2 volumes
(1961) On Wings of Eagles: The Plight, Exodus, and Homecoming of Oriental Jewry. New York: T. Yoseloff, 1961.  OCLC Number: 1549405 
(1961). Fighter and prophet: The Vladimir Jabotinsky story : the last years. New York: Yoseloff.
(1961). Star in eclipse: Russian Jewry revisited. New York: T. Yoseloff. 
(1962) Postwar Population Transfers in Europe: 1945 - 1955. Philadelphia, Pa: Univ. of Pennsylvania Press, 1962.  OCLC Number: 248807362
(1963) Postwar population transfers in Europe 1945-1955 Philadelphia, University of Pennsylvania Press. OCLC Number: 16738401
(1964) The refugees in the world; displacement and integration. New York, Barnes. OCLC Number: 487032
(1964) Fact sheet on Arab refugees. New York: Information Dept., the Jewish Agency - American Section Inc. 
(1965) The Mufti and the Fuehrer; the rise and fall of Haj Amin el-Husseini. New York, T. Yoseloff. OCLC Number: 721185
(1966) Zionism and Zionists in Soviet Russia: greatness and drama. [New York], Zionist Organization of America. OCLC Number: 894684
(1966) The United States and the Jewish State movement: the crucial decade, 1939-1949. New York, Herzl Press.  OCLC Number: 905103
(1968) Jordan: A State That Never Was. New York: Cultural Pub. Co, 1968.     
(1969) Arab Terror: Blueprint for Political Murder. New York: Zionist Organization of America, 1969. Print. OCLC Number: 296914
(1969) Israel Explodes Dir Yassin Blood Libel. New York, N.Y: United Zionists Revisionists of America, 1969. Print.
(1970) with Yehuda Benari.History of the Revisionist Movement. Tel-Aviv: Hadar, 1970. 
(1971). European population transfers'', 1939–1945. New York: Russell & Russell.

References

Further reading
 ШЕХТМАН Иосеф (КЕЭ, том 10, кол. 1890–190) Joseph Schechtman article in Short Jewish Encyclopedia

1891 births
1970 deaths
Jewish historians
Writers from Odesa
Odesa Jews
Revisionist Zionism
Zionist activists
Russian emigrants to Germany